Trifylli may refer to the following places in Greece:

Trifylli, Evros, part of the municipality Alexandroupoli in the Evros regional unit
Trifylli, Grevena, part of the municipality Deskati in the Grevena regional unit